Norske Skog Union was a paper mill located in Skien in Norway. The mill was part of the Norske Skog Corporation and opened in 1873 with the name Union Co. The mill had two paper machines that produced 240,000 tonnes of newsprint and book paper. It was closed down in 2006.

History
In 1872 Ulrik Sinding had established a pulp mill beside the waterfall Damfossen in Skien. The pulp mill was not profitable and in 1873 Benjamin Sewell bought the waterfall and the lots. This is considered the foundation of Union Co. In 1890 Union Co was merged with Skotfoss Bruk and Løveid Fabrikker at Skotfoss, where Union much later build Scandinavia's first electric railway, operated until 1966.

In the years that followed Union acquired a lot of companies, in 1916 they bought Skiens Papirfabrikk on Klosterøya in addition to many pulp mills. The mill at Skotfoss was closed in 1986 while there still was operation on Klosterøya.

The Norske Skog corporation bought Union in 1999. Cutbacks were soon implemented and in 2005 it was decided to close the mill, to large protests from the local population and politicians. One primary complaint was that Norske Skog wanted to sell the mill despite it operating at a profit. Norske Skog declined to sell the plant to other investors. The mill ceased operations in March 2006.

External links
Corporate web site
Corporate entry on Union

Pulp and paper mills in Norway
Defunct companies of Norway
Companies based in Skien
Norske Skog
Companies established in 1873
Companies disestablished in 2006
1873 establishments in Norway